The Caproni Ca.103 was a biplane twin-engine bomber developed by the Italian company Aeronautica Caproni in the late 1920s.

Design
The Ca.103 had a fuselage, with a rectangular section and made of welded tubes, that integrated the two-seater closed cockpit placed at the wing connection edge and intercommunicating with the three positions for machine guns and pointer. On the rear, it ended up with a single drift fletching equipped with horizontal counter-braced sesquiplane planes, connected to each other by a pair of "V-shaped" uprights, and with the lower plane with adjustable incidence in flight. The wing configuration was sesquiplana inverted with neutral scaling, ie with a higher wing plane with a significantly shorter opening and positioned directly above the lower one, the latter being the only one with a differential slit aileron . The wings, both characterized by a sensitive positive dihedral angle, were connected to each other by a series of riser pairs in Warren truss configuration. The landing gear had a fixed classic tricycle configuration, with a front element with an interrupted axle and an elastic upright, with uncovered wheels equipped with brakes, integrated at the back by a swiveling support wheel which was also elastically cushioned.

Specifications

See also

References

Ca.103
1920s Italian bomber aircraft